Since the first award in 1901, conferment of the Nobel Prize has occasionally engendered criticism and controversy. After his death in 1896, the will of Swedish industrialist Alfred Nobel established that an annual prize be awarded for service to humanity in the fields of physics, chemistry, physiology or medicine, literature, and peace. Similarly, the Sveriges Riksbank Prize in Economic Sciences in Memory of Alfred Nobel is awarded along with the Nobel Prizes.

Nobel sought to reward "those who, during the preceding year, shall have conferred the greatest benefit on mankind". One prize, he stated, should be given "to the person who shall have made the most important 'discovery' or 'invention' within the field of physics". Awards committees have historically rewarded discoveries over inventions: up to 2004, 77 per cent of Nobel Prizes in physics have been given to discoveries, compared with only 23 per cent to inventions. In addition, the scientific prizes typically reward contributions over an entire career rather than a single year.

No Nobel Prize was established for mathematics and many other scientific and cultural fields. An early theory that envy or rivalry led Nobel to omit a prize to mathematician Gösta Mittag-Leffler was refuted because of timing inaccuracies. Another myth that states that Nobel's spouse had an affair with a mathematician (sometimes attributed as Mittag-Leffler) has been equally debunked; Nobel was never married. A more likely explanation is that Nobel did not consider mathematics as a practical discipline, and too theoretical to benefit humankind, as well as his personal lack of interest in the field and the fact that an award to mathematicians given by Oscar II already existed at the time. Both the Fields Medal and the Abel Prize have been described as the "Nobel Prize of mathematics".

The most notorious controversies have been over prizes for Literature, Peace, and Economics. Beyond disputes over which contributor's work was more worthy, critics most often discerned political bias and Eurocentrism in the result. The interpretation of Nobel's original words concerning the Literature prize has also undergone repeated revisions.

A major controversies-generating factor for the more recent scientific prizes (Physics, Chemistry, and Medicine) is the Nobel rule that each award can not be shared by more than two different researches and no more than three different individuals each year. While this rule was adequate in 1901, when most of the science research was performed by individual scientists working with their small group of assistants in relative isolation, in more recent times science research has increasingly become a matter of widespread international cooperation and exchange of ideas among different research groups, themselves composed of dozens or even hundreds of researchers, spread over the years of effort needed to hypothesize, refine and prove a discovery. This has led to glaring omissions of key participants in awarded researches: as an example see below the case of the 2008 Nobel Prize for Physics, or the case of the Atlas/CMS Collaboration that produced the scientific papers that documented the Higgs boson discovery and included a list of researchers filling 15 single-spaced pages.

Chemistry

2020
The Lithuanian and Spanish scientific communities expressed disappointment when the committee did not include Virginijus Šikšnys or Francisco Mojica along with Emmanuelle Charpentier and Jennifer Doudna in the award as both of them made crucial contributions to the development of CRISPR gene editing technology.

2019
When the 2019 prize was awarded, numerous scientific societies reacted to Rachid Yazami's omission for his co-invention of the lithium-ion battery with Stanley Whittingham who was recognized. Whittingham shared the prize with John Goodenough for their cathodes and Akira Yoshino for the first working prototype unlike the importance of the working graphite anode invented by Yazami. Due to the Nobel Prize's limitation of up to three recipients, Yazami believes the committee had to make a difficult decision between Whittingham and himself. He nevertheless congratulated the three recipients of the prize.

2008
The 2008 prize was awarded to Osamu Shimomura, Martin Chalfie and Roger Y. Tsien for their work on green fluorescent protein (GFP). The fact that a fourth potential recipient, Douglas Prasher, the first to clone the GFP gene and suggest its use as a biological tracer, was working as a courtesy shuttle bus driver received considerable media coverage. Lack of support for Prasher's work, and failure to get tenure at the Woods Hole Oceanographic Institute in Massachusetts where he was employed, caused Prasher to leave this field of research in 1992, but not before he offered samples of the gene to any interested researchers, including Chalfie and Tsien. Tsien noted the prize is usually awarded for "specific discoveries" and that he had put forward Shimomura and Prasher to the Nobel Committee in 2004. Chalfie stated, "Douglas Prasher's work was critical and essential for the work we did in our lab. They could've easily given the prize to Douglas and the other two and left me out." Roger Tsien had offered Prasher a job when his academic career stalled. Eventually, Prasher accepted the offer and moved in 2013 to UCSD to join Tsien's lab.

2007
Gerhard Ertl, who was the sole recipient of the 2007 Nobel Prize in Chemistry for his studies of the catalytic effects of metal surfaces, has expressed surprise and disappointment that Gábor Somorjai, a foundational pioneer in modern surface science and catalysis, did not share the prize. Somorjai and Ertl had previously shared the Wolf Prize for Chemistry in 1998. The Nobel Prize committee's decision to exclude Somorjai was criticized in the surface-science community and remains mysterious.

2003
Peter Agre was awarded the 2003 prize "for the discovery of water channels". Agre published his study about aquaporin in 1988; Gheorghe Benga had showed the existence of a protein water channel in the red blood cell membrane in 1986. The omission of Benga from the 2003 prize has been called a mistake in the awarding of Nobel Prizes. Agre acknowledged the contribution of Benga and others to the field discovery of aquaporins in his Nobel Lecture: "Their [aquaporins] existence was suggested by a group of pioneers in the water transport field who preceded us by decades".

1922–1946
From 1922 to 1946, Gilbert N. Lewis, who was widely known for his coining of the covalent bond, electron pair, Lewis structure and other seminal contributions that have become near-universal conventions in chemistry, was nominated 41 times for the Nobel Prize in Chemistry but never won. It has been speculated that while working in Walther Nernst's lab, Lewis developed a lifelong enmity with Nernst. In the following years, Lewis started to criticize and denounce his former teacher on many occasions, calling Nernst's work on his heat theorem "a regrettable episode in the history of chemistry". A friend of Nernst's, was a member of the Nobel Chemistry committee. There is evidence that he used the Nobel nominating and reporting procedures to block a Nobel Prize for Lewis in thermodynamics by nominating Lewis for the prize three times, and then using his position as a committee member to write negative reports.

1918
The 1918 Nobel Prize in Chemistry was awarded to Fritz Haber for his invention of the Haber–Bosch process, which allowed for the efficient synthesis of ammonia, leading to the economical mass production of chemical fertilizers. The award was controversial, as Haber had overseen Germany's chemical weapons program during World War I. The Nobel Prize committee considered his war activities but noted his ammonia synthesis process was "the greatest benefit to mankind".

Others
 While Henry Eyring (1901–1981) allegedly failed to receive the prize because of his membership in the Church of Jesus Christ of Latter-day Saints, it is also possible that the Royal Swedish Academy of Sciences did not understand Eyring's theory until it was too late to award him the prize; the academy awarded him the Berzelius Medal in 1977 as partial compensation.
 Dmitri Mendeleyev, the original creator of the periodic table of the elements, never received a Nobel Prize. He completed his first periodic table in 1869. However, a year earlier, another chemist, Julius Lothar Meyer, had reported a somewhat similar table. In 1866, John Alexander Reina Newlands presented a paper that first proposed a periodic law. However, none of these tables were correct—the 19th-century tables arranged the elements in order of increasing atomic weight (or atomic mass). It was left to the English physicist Henry Moseley to base the periodic table on the atomic number (the number of protons). Mendeleyev died in 1907, six years after the first Nobel Prizes were awarded. He came within one vote of winning in 1906, but died the next year. Hargittai claimed that Mendeleyev's omission was due to behind-the-scenes machinations of one dissenter on the Nobel Committee who disagreed with his work.

Economics

Economics was not on Nobel's original list of prize disciplines. Sweden's central bank Sveriges Riksbank created the Sveriges Riksbank Prize in Economic Sciences in Memory of Alfred Nobel in 1969. Although it is governed by the same rules as the others, many, including members of the Nobel family, criticized this prize for violating Nobel's intent. , the faculty of the University of Chicago had garnered nine Prizes—far more than any other university. This led to claims of bias against alternative or heterodox economics.

1994
The 1994 prize to John Forbes Nash and others "for their pioneering analysis of equilibria in the theory of non-cooperative games" caused controversy within the selection committee because of Nash's mental illness and alleged anti-Semitism. The controversy resulted in a change to the governing committee: members served three-year instead of unlimited terms and the prize's scope expanded to include political science, psychology, and sociology.

1976
The 1976 prize was awarded to Milton Friedman "for his achievements in the fields of consumption analysis, monetary history and theory and for his demonstration of the complexity of stabilisation policy". The award caused international protests because of Friedman's association with Chilean dictator Augusto Pinochet. During March 1975, Friedman visited Chile and gave lectures on inflation, meeting with Pinochet and other government officials.

Literature
The Nobel Prize in Literature has a history of controversial awards. Many major authors have been ignored by the Nobel Committee, including Irishman James Joyce, Frenchman Marcel Proust, Argentinian Jorge Luis Borges and Americans Henry James, W. H. Auden, Philip Roth, and John Updike. Joseph Epstein, writing in the Wall Street Journal, noted: "You may not know it, but you and I are members of a club whose fellow members include Leo Tolstoy, Henry James, Anton Chekhov, Mark Twain, Henrik Ibsen, Marcel Proust, Joseph Conrad, James Joyce, Thomas Hardy, Jorge Luis Borges and Vladimir Nabokov. The club is the Non-Winners of the Nobel Prize in Literature. All these authentically great writers, still alive when the prize, initiated in 1901, was being awarded, didn't win it." This led him to speculate that "Criteria other than high art seem to be involved."

From 1901 to 1912, the committee's work reflected an interpretation of the "ideal direction" stated in Nobel's will as "a lofty and sound idealism", which caused Leo Tolstoy, Henrik Ibsen, Émile Zola and Mark Twain to be rejected. Sweden's historic antipathy towards Russia was cited as the reason neither Tolstoy nor Anton Chekhov took the prize. During World War I and its immediate aftermath, the committee adopted a policy of neutrality, favouring writers from non-combatant countries.

Another notable omission for the prize is R. K. Narayan, an Indian writer known for his works set in the fictional South Indian town of Malgudi and for abridged versions of the Indian epics – The Ramayana and The Mahabharata. Despite being nominated and shortlisted for the Nobel Prize in Literature multiple times, Narayan never won the honour. In the 1960s, Graham Greene, who took it upon himself to work as Narayan's agent for his works, expressed confidence that Narayan would one day win the Nobel Prize. Agreeing with Greene's views, Jeffrey Archer more recently echoed the view that R. K. Narayan should have indeed won the Nobel Prize. One of the jokes in literary circles was that the Nobel Literature Committee ignored his books or was confused because of the misleading titles: many people supposedly thought that they were self-help books on various subjects – The Guide, The English Teacher, The Painter of Signs, The Vendor of Sweets, etc. Other humorous speculations on what might have tripped him, "His writing is too simple, and too readable, requiring no effort on the part of the reader. He has created a new map called Malgudi in which his characters live and die. Story after story is set in the same place, which is not progressive, a rather stagnant background."

The heavy focus on European authors, and Swedes in particular, is the subject of mounting criticism, including from major Swedish newspapers. The majority of the laureates for the Nobel Prize in Literature have been European. Swedes in particular have received more prizes in this category than all of Asia. In 2008, Horace Engdahl, then the permanent secretary of the academy, declared that "Europe still is the center of the literary world" and said that American writers did not win often (the most recent at the time was Toni Morrison, 15 years prior) because "the US is too isolated, too insular. They don't translate enough and don't really participate in the big dialogue of literature." In 2009, Engdahl's replacement, Peter Englund, rejected this sentiment ("In most language areas ... there are authors that really deserve and could get the Nobel Prize and that goes for the United States and the Americas, as well"), and acknowledged the Eurocentric bias of the selections, saying that, "I think that is a problem. We tend to relate more easily to literature written in Europe and in the European tradition."

2019

The 2019 prize awarded to Austrian novelist and playwright Peter Handke came under heavy criticism due to his history of denying the Bosnian genocide and his vocal support for late Serbian President Slobodan Milošević, even speaking at his funeral in 2006. Authors Miha Mazzini, Hari Kunzru, Jonathan Littell, Slavoj Žižek, and Salman Rushdie each heavily criticized the choice, and it was further condemned by PEN International and Holocaust historian Deborah Lipstadt, who said that the award gave his views a platform that "he does not deserve and the public does not need him to have". The governments of Bosnia and Herzegovina, Kosovo, and Turkey issued condemnations against the award, and the ambassadors from Albania, Bosnia, Croatia, Kosovo, North Macedonia, and Turkey boycotted the award ceremony. Hundreds of people protested outside the award ceremony, and a petition to revoke the award received close to 60,000 signatures.

2016

The 2016 prize awarded to Bob Dylan was controversial, since it marked the first time that a songwriter-musician had been awarded the prize. Many writers and commentators, mostly novelists, objected, feeling it cheapened the prize. Scottish novelist Irvine Welsh stated "I'm a Dylan fan, but this is an ill-conceived nostalgia award wrenched from the rancid prostates of senile, gibbering hippies", while Lebanese novelist Rabih Alameddine argued that "Bob Dylan winning a Nobel in Literature is like Mrs Fields being awarded 3 Michelin stars." However, others noted that poetry has long been recognized by the committee and speculated that the popularity of Dylan's work was the true motive behind those objecting. Songwriter Leonard Cohen said that awarding Dylan the prize was "like pinning a medal on Mount Everest for being the highest mountain".

In a live webchat hosted by The Guardian, Norwegian writer Karl Ove Knausgård said that "I'm very divided. I love that the Nobel committee opens up for other kinds of literature – lyrics and so on. I think that's brilliant. But knowing that Dylan is the same generation as Thomas Pynchon, Philip Roth, Cormac McCarthy, makes it very difficult for me to accept it."

2010

The 2010 prize awarded to Peruvian writer Mario Vargas Llosa stirred controversy, mainly due to his right-wing political views. Vargas Llosa was even dubbed "king of controversies" for focusing more on politics than literature.

2009

The 2009 prize awarded to Herta Müller was criticized because many U.S. literary critics and professors had never heard of Müller before. This reignited criticism that the committee was too Eurocentric.

2005

The 2005 prize went to Harold Pinter, "who in his plays uncovers the precipice under everyday prattle and forces entry into oppression's closed rooms". The award was delayed for some days, apparently due to Knut Ahnlund's resignation. In turn, this renewed speculation about a "political element" existing in the Swedish Academy's awarding of the Prize. Although poor health prevented him from giving his controversial Nobel Lecture, "Art, Truth and Politics", in person, Pinter appeared on video, which was simultaneously transmitted on Britain's Channel Four. The issue of "political stance" was also raised in response to Orhan Pamuk and Doris Lessing, prizewinners in 2006 and 2007, respectively.

2004

The 2004 prize was awarded to Elfriede Jelinek. Academy member Knut Ahnlund, who had been inactive since 1996, resigned, alleging that selecting Jelinek had caused "irreparable damage" to the prize's reputation.

1997

The 1997 prize went to Italian actor-playwright Dario Fo who was initially considered "rather lightweight" by some critics, as he was seen primarily as a performer and had previously been censured by the Roman Catholic Church. Salman Rushdie and Arthur Miller had been favoured to receive the prize, but a committee member was later quoted as saying that they would have been "too predictable, too popular".

1974

The 1974 prize was awarded to the Swedish authors Eyvind Johnson and Harry Martinson: both themselves members of the Swedish Academy and little known outside their home country. Graham Greene, Jorge Luis Borges, Saul Bellow and Vladimir Nabokov were favourites to win the award that year. Bellow won in 1976; neither Greene, Borges nor Nabokov were awarded the prize.

1970

The 1970 prize was awarded to Soviet dissident Aleksandr Solzhenitsyn, who did not attend the ceremony in Stockholm for fear that the Soviet Union would prevent his return. His works there were available only in samizdat-published, clandestine form. After the Swedish government refused to hold a public award ceremony and lecture at its Moscow embassy, Solzhenitsyn refused the award altogether, commenting that the conditions set by the Swedes (who preferred a private ceremony) were "an insult to the Nobel Prize itself". Solzhenitsyn later accepted the award on 10 December 1974, after the Soviet Union banished him. Critics suggest that Solzhenitsyn was awarded the prize because of his political stance, not his writing.

1964

Jean-Paul Sartre declined the Nobel Prize in Literature, claiming that he refused official distinctions and did not want to be institutionalised and for fear that it would limit the impact of his writing. While Sartre's statement to the Swedish press was polite, in the 1976 documentary film  (Sartre by Himself) he revealed quite opposite reasons for rejecting the Nobel Prize: "Because I was politically involved, the bourgeois establishment wanted to cover up my past errors. Now there's an admission! And so they gave me the Nobel Prize. They pardoned me and said I deserved it. It was monstrous!"

1902–1910
Leo Tolstoy was nominated for the Nobel Prize in Literature every year from 1902 to 1906 but never won, and in 1901 he was not even nominated, resulting in a major controversy. The 1901 prize went instead to French poet Sully Prudhomme, and the year after to German historian Theodor Mommsen. Reports suggest that Tolstoy did not receive the prize because of the jury's reservations towards his political and religious positions as well as Sweden's historical enmity towards Russia. In 1901, 42 Swedish writers, including August Strindberg, wrote Tolstoy a letter following the announcement, expressing their dissatisfaction with the decision.

Others
Czech writer Karel Čapek's War With the Newts was considered too offensive to the German government, and he declined to suggest a non-controversial publication that could be cited in its stead ("Thank you for the good will, but I have already written my doctoral dissertation"). He never received a prize.

French novelist and intellectual André Malraux was considered for the Literature prize in the 1950s, according to Swedish Academy archives studied by the newspaper  on their opening in 2008. Malraux was competing with Albert Camus, but was rejected several times, especially in 1954 and 1955, "so long as he does not come back to the novel", while Camus won the prize in 1957.

Argentine writer Jorge Luis Borges was nominated several times but never won. Edwin Williamson, Borges' biographer, stated that the author's support of Argentine and Chilean right-wing military dictators may have been a factor. Borges' failure to win the Nobel Prize contrasts with awards to writers who openly supported left-wing dictatorships, including that of Joseph Stalin in the case of Jean-Paul Sartre and Pablo Neruda, and of Fidel Castro in the case of Gabriel García Márquez.

The academy's refusal to express support for Salman Rushdie in 1989, after Ayatollah Ruhollah Khomeini issued a fatwā on his life, led two Academy members to resign.

Peace
Nobel Peace Prize controversies often reach beyond the academic community. Criticism that have been levelled against some of the awards include allegations that they were politically motivated, premature, or guided by a faulty definition of what constitutes work for peace.

2016

On 7 October 2016 Nobel Peace Prize went to the President of Colombia Juan Manuel Santos for his efforts working with the Marxist–Leninist guerrilla group Revolutionary Armed Forces of Colombia (FARC) to bring the more than 50-year-long Colombian civil war to an end.

The award was noted as being premature since it was conferred five days after the nation narrowly rejected his peace plan in the 2016 Colombian peace agreement referendum On November 24, 2016, the Colombian government and the FARC signed a revised peace deal, which the Colombian Congress approved on 30 November.

2012

The 2012 prize went to the European Union for "over six decades contributed to the advancement of peace and reconciliation, democracy and human rights in Europe". Among other objections, some former laureates disputed the award, claiming that the EU is "clearly not a champion of peace".

2010

The 2010 prize went to Liu Xiaobo "for his long and non-violent struggle for fundamental human rights in China". Liu was imprisoned at the time of the award and neither he nor his family were allowed to attend the ceremony. The Chinese government alleged that Liu did not promote "international friendship, disarmament, and peace meetings", the prize's stated goal. The award led to a diplomatic dispute between Norway and China. Relations were normalized in December 2016.

Pro-Chinese government and state-controlled media had criticized Liu's selection due to his low profile and obscurity within China and among Chinese youth. Barry Sautman and Yan Hairong, writing in The Guardian, also criticized Liu's selection for his long support of American involvement in wars in other nations, particularly Vietnam, Korea, Afghanistan, and Iraq.

2009

The 2009 prize went to Barack Obama "for his extraordinary efforts to strengthen international diplomacy and cooperation between peoples". The award, given just nine months into Obama's first term as president, received criticism that it was undeserved, premature, politically motivated, and wishful. Obama himself said that he felt "surprised" by the win and did not consider himself worthy of the award, but nonetheless accepted it. Obama's peace prize was called a "stunning surprise" by The New York Times. Much of the surprise arose from the fact that nominations for the award had been due by 1 February 2009, only 12 days after Obama took office. In an October 2011 interview, Thorbjørn Jagland, chairman of the Norwegian Nobel Committee, was asked whether Obama had lived up to the prize, and replied:

In 2015, Geir Lundestad, director of the Norwegian Nobel Institute (who sat in on the committee's meetings but did not have a vote), wrote in his memoir, Secretary of Peace, that he regretted giving the prize to Obama. The committee "thought it would strengthen Obama and it didn't have this effect", Lundestad told the Associated Press, though he fell short of calling the award a mistake. "In hindsight, we could say that the argument of giving Obama a helping hand was only partially correct", Lundestad wrote. Critics also argued that the award was a symbolic rejection of the George W. Bush Administration.

2004
The 2004 prize went to Wangari Maathai "for her contribution to sustainable development, democracy and peace". Controversially, she was reported by the Kenyan newspaper The Standard and Radio Free Europe to have stated that HIV/AIDS was originally developed by Western scientists in order to depopulate Africa. She later denied these claims, although The Standard stood by its reporting. Additionally, in a Time magazine interview, she hinted that she believed HIV had a non-natural origin, saying that someone knows where it came from and that it "did not come from monkeys".

2002
The 2002 prize went to Jimmy Carter for "decades of untiring effort to find peaceful solutions to international conflicts, to advance democracy and human rights, and to promote economic and social development". The announcement of the award came shortly after the US House and Senate authorized President George W. Bush to use military force against Iraq in order to enforce UN Security Council resolutions requiring that Baghdad give up weapons of mass destruction. Asked if the selection of the former president was a criticism of Bush, Gunnar Berge, head of the Nobel Prize committee, said: "With the position Carter has taken on this, it can and must also be seen as criticism of the line the current US administration has taken on Iraq." Carter declined to comment on the remark in interviews, saying that he preferred to focus on the work of the Carter Center.

2000
The 2000 prize went to Kim Dae-jung "for his work for democracy and human rights in South Korea and in East Asia in general, and for peace and reconciliation with North Korea in particular". Criticisms argued that Kim made a historical event in North Korea, which was tainted significantly by allegations that at least several hundred million dollars had been paid to Pyongyang. His Chief of Staff, Park Ji-won, was sentenced to twelve years in prison in 2003 for, among other charges, his role in the Hyundai payment to North Korea for the North–South summit. Also in order to persuade North Korea to attend the summit, several "unconverted long-term prisoners" kept by South Korea were released and returned to North Korea.

1994
The 1994 prize went to Yasser Arafat, Shimon Peres, and Yitzhak Rabin "for their efforts to create peace in the Middle East". Kåre Kristiansen, a member of the Nobel Committee, resigned in protest at Arafat's award, citing his sponsorship of terrorism through the PLO and calling him the "world's most prominent terrorist". On the other hand, Edward Said was critical of Peres and Rabin and the entire Oslo Accords.

1992
The 1992 prize went to Rigoberta Menchú for "her work for social justice and ethno-cultural reconciliation based on respect for the rights of indigenous peoples". The prize was controversial because the prize-winner's memoirs, which had brought her to fame, turned out to be partly fictitious.

1973
The 1973 prize went to North Vietnamese communist leader Lê Đức Thọ and United States Secretary of State Henry A. Kissinger "for the 1973 Paris Peace Accords intended to bring about a cease-fire in the Vietnam War and a withdrawal of the American forces". Thọ later declined the prize, on grounds that such "bourgeois sentimentalities" were not for him and that the Paris Peace Accords were not being adhered to in full. Kissinger was also privately skeptical about sharing the prize, saying to Soviet ambassador Anatoly Dobrynin "I figure it like Groucho Marx said 'any club that took him in he would not want to join'. I would say that anything Lê Đức Thọ is eligible for, there must be something wrong with it."

North Vietnam invaded South Vietnam in April 1975 and reunified the country whilst Lê Đức Thọ was still in government. Thọ had also been in government during the Tet Offensive, a Viet Cong surprise assault that killed and wounded over 25,000 civilians, destroyed 75,000 homes, and displaced over 670,000 people. Kissinger's history included the secret 1969–1975 bombing campaign against Khmer Rouge and North Vietnamese Army troops in Cambodia, the alleged U.S. complicity in Operation Condor—a mid-1970s campaign of kidnapping and murder coordinated among the intelligence and security services of Argentina, Bolivia, Brazil, Chile (see details), Paraguay, and Uruguay—as well as the death of French nationals under the Chilean junta. He also supported the Turkish invasion of Cyprus, resulting in the de facto partition of the island. According to Irwin Abrams in 2001, this prize was the most controversial to date. Two Norwegian Nobel Committee members resigned in protest.

The American press also reacted with consternation to the award: the New York Times dubbed it the "Nobel War Prize"; the Washington Post quoted retired diplomat George Ball as saying that on the evidence "The Norwegians must have a sense of humour." The well-known comedian and political satirist Tom Lehrer said: "Political satire became obsolete when Henry Kissinger was awarded the Nobel peace prize." When the award was announced, hostilities were continuing.

Kissinger did not attend the award ceremony in Oslo over concern that it would be targeted by anti-war protest groups. He requested that the prize money be donated to a scholarship fund for US servicemen killed or missing in Indochina. In 1975, as Saigon fell to North Vietnamese forces, he offered to return the medal, an offer not accepted by the Nobel Committee.

1939
In a submission not intended to be taken seriously, antifascist member of the Swedish parliament Erik Gottfrid Christian Brandt nominated German dictator Adolf Hitler, but the nomination was cancelled. No prize was awarded in 1939 to anyone for peace.

1935
The prize of 1935 was retroactively awarded one year later to Carl von Ossietzky, a German pacifist who had been convicted of high treason and espionage for exposing German re-armament. In an unprecedented move, King Haakon VII of Norway was absent from the award ceremony, two committee members resigned in protest, and the Norwegian conservative press, including leading daily Aftenposten, condemned giving the award to a convicted criminal. Ossietzky, interned in the concentration camp Esterwegen and severely ill with tuberculosis, accepted the award by letter but was prevented from traveling to Oslo. The award led to Adolf Hitler's forbidding any German to receive any of the Nobel Prizes in the future, and Ossietzky's prize was not allowed to be mentioned in the German press.

Mahatma Gandhi

Mohandas Karamchand Gandhi (Mahatma Gandhi) never received the Nobel Peace Prize, although he was nominated five times between 1937 and 1948. In 1948 Gandhi received six letters of nomination and was on the shortlist for the Peace Prize but he was assassinated on 30 January 1948, two days before the closing date for nominations. The Nobel Committee decided against awarding the prize, saying the laureate could only be awarded posthumously if the laureate died after the committee's decision had been made. The Nobel Committee ultimately made no award in 1948, stating "there was no suitable living candidate". Decades later, a Nobel Committee publicly declared its regret for the omission. Geir Lundestad, Secretary of the Norwegian Nobel Committee in 2006, said, "The greatest omission in our 106-year history is undoubtedly that Mahatma Gandhi never received the Nobel Peace prize. Gandhi could do without the Nobel Peace prize, [but] whether Nobel committee can do without Gandhi is the question".

Physics

2017

The 2017 Nobel Prize in Physics was awarded to Reiner Weiss, Kip Thorne, and Barry Barish for their contribution to LIGO, which led to the detection of gravitational waves. Despite the contributions of the upwards of a thousand scientists and engineers in LIGO, the Nobel Committee continued its tradition of awarding the prize to only three physicists. All three winners commented saying that the prize belongs to the entire LIGO Collaboration (LSC). Thorne said "It is unfortunate that, due to the statutes of the Nobel Foundation, the prize has to go to no more than three people, when our marvelous discovery is the work of more than a thousand."

2014
The 2014 Nobel Prize in Physics, awarded to Isamu Akasaki, Hiroshi Amano and Shuji Nakamura for the blue light-emitting diode, did not recognize the decades of incremental work in developing the LED by other pioneers such as Oleg Losev, Nick Holonyak, and Gertrude Neumark and overlooked a prior claim for invention of the blue LED by RCA materials researcher Herbert Paul Maruska.

2013
Peter Higgs and François Englert were awarded the 2013 Nobel Prize in Physics for their theoretical predictions related to the Higgs boson. This ran into the problem of the Nobel only awarding three individuals since three separate 1964 PRL symmetry breaking papers have been credited with the discovery of the Higgs mechanism and Higgs boson. These PRL papers were written by 1) Robert Brout and François Englert, 2) Peter Higgs, and 3) Gerald Guralnik, C. Richard Hagen, and Tom Kibble. Brout died a few years earlier and was not included. There was debate over whether Guralnik/Hagen/Kibble should have been included in the Nobel Prize for their 1964 PRL symmetry breaking papers. CERN, whose experiments proved the existence of the Higgs boson, was also excluded from the 2013 Prize.

2010
The 2010 Nobel Prize in Physics was awarded to Andre Geim and Konstantin Novoselov of the University of Manchester "for groundbreaking experiments regarding the two-dimensional material graphene". Several problems with the factual accuracy of the supporting documents issued by the Nobel committee have been pointed out, including that they seem to wrongly attribute the discovery of graphene to Geim and Novoselov, and they did not take into account other contributions to graphene research.

2009
The 2009 Nobel Prize in Physics, divided between three recipients over two disciplines, led to some omissions. Charles Kuen Kao's award for his work in fiber optics led to claims that Narinder Singh Kapany's previous work had been overlooked. Willard Boyle and George E. Smith's award for the development of the charge-coupled device led to Eugene I. Gordon and Michael Francis Tompsett claiming that it should have been theirs for establishing that the technology could be used for imaging.

2008
Half of the 2008 prize went to Makoto Kobayashi and Toshihide Maskawa for their 1972 work on quark mixing. This postulated the existence of three additional quarks beyond the three then known to exist and used this postulate to provide a possible mechanism for CP violation, which had been observed 8 years earlier. Their work expanded and reinterpreted research by the Italian physicist Nicola Cabibbo, dating to 1963, before the quark model was even introduced. The resulting quark mixing matrix, which described probabilities of different quarks to turn into each other under the action of the weak force, is known as CKM matrix, after Cabibbo, Kobayashi, and Maskawa. Cabibbo arguably merited a share of the award. The recipient of the other half of the 2008 prize was Yoichiro Nambu for the discovery of the mechanism of spontaneous broken symmetry in subatomic physics. The fundamental step in this field is the Nambu–Jona-Lasinio model (NJL model), developed together with the Italian theoretical physicist Giovanni Jona-Lasinio, who was left out of the prize like Cabibbo. In recognition to his colleague's work, Nambu asked Jona-Lasinio to hold the Nobel Lecture at the Stockholm University in his place. As the prize is awarded each year to at most three people for no more than two different research works, the committee was forced to skip one member each from both the CKM and the NJL workgroups.

2005

Half of the 2005 prize went to Roy J. Glauber "for his contribution to the quantum theory of optical coherence". Several physicists wrote to the Swedish Academy, protesting that Indian theoretical physicist E. C. George Sudarshan should have been awarded a share of the Prize for the Sudarshan diagonal representation (also known as Glauber–Sudarshan representation) in quantum optics, for which Glauber won his share of the prize. Sudarshan and other physicists sent a letter to the Nobel Committee claiming that the P representation had more contributions of "Sudarshan" than "Glauber".

1997
The 1997 prize went to Steven Chu, Claude Cohen-Tannoudji and William Daniel Phillips "for development of methods to cool and trap atoms with laser light". The award was disputed by Russian scientists who questioned the awardees' priority in the acquired approach and techniques, which the Russians claimed to have carried out more than a decade before.

1983
Half of the 1983 prize went to William Alfred Fowler "for his theoretical and experimental studies of the nuclear reactions of importance in the formation of the chemical elements in the universe". Fowler acknowledged Fred Hoyle as the pioneer of the concept of stellar nucleosynthesis but Hoyle did not receive a share in the prize. Hoyle's championing of many disreputable and disproven ideas may have damaged his overall reputation and invalidated him in the Nobel committee's view. Hoyle's obituary in Physics Today notes that "Many of us felt that Hoyle should have shared Fowler's 1983 Nobel Prize in Physics, but the Royal Swedish Academy of Sciences later made partial amends by awarding Hoyle, with Edwin Salpeter, its 1997 Crafoord Prize".

1978
The 1978 prize was awarded for the chanced "detection of cosmic microwave background radiation" by Bell Labs physicists Arno Allan Penzias and Robert Woodrow Wilson. There was some controversy over the award for a serendipitous discovery since it did not include Ralph Alpher and Robert Herman, who predicted the cosmic microwave background radiation in 1948, or Princeton physicist Robert Dicke who was also searching for the same phenomenon and co-published with Penzias and Wilson, explaining their results.

1974
The 1974 prize went to Martin Ryle and Antony Hewish "for their pioneering research in radio astrophysics: Ryle for his observations and inventions, in particular of the aperture synthesis technique, and Hewish for his decisive role in the discovery of pulsars". Jocelyn Bell Burnell, Hewish's graduate student, was not recognized, despite being the first to notice the stellar radio source, later recognized as a pulsar.  Hewish had initially mistaken Bell's findings as 'radio interference'.  While Fred Hoyle argued that Bell should have been included in the prize, Bell said, "I believe it would demean Nobel Prizes if they were awarded to research students, except in very exceptional cases, and I do not believe this is one of them."

Over four decades later, Bell Burnell was recognized with a three million dollar Special Breakthrough Prize in Fundamental Physics of which she donated the entirety to assist female, minority, and refugee students in becoming physics researchers.

1938
The 1938 prize went to Enrico Fermi in part for "his demonstrations of the existence of new radioactive elements produced by neutron irradiation". His team's discovery of slow neutrons and different types of radioactivity were correct but the transuranic elements he thought they had created (specifically, hesperium) actually turned out to be fission products—isotopes of much lighter elements than uranium). The fact that this interpretation was incorrect was discovered shortly after he received his prize and he added a footnote to this effect to his Nobel Prize acceptance speech.

1923
The 1923 prize went to Robert Millikan "for his work on the elementary charge of electricity and on the photoelectric effect". Millikan might have won in 1920 but for Felix Ehrenhaft's incorrect claim to have measured a smaller charge. Some controversy, however, still seems to linger over Millikan's oil-drop procedure and experimental interpretation, over whether Millikan manipulated his data in the 1913 scientific paper measuring the electron charge. Allegedly, he did not report all his observations.

Other major unrecognized discoveries
None of the contributors to the discovery of nuclear fission won the prize for Physics. Instead, the prize for Chemistry was awarded to Otto Hahn for his discovery of fission in Berlin in 1938. Lise Meitner also contributed to the discovery of nuclear fission, through her collaboration with Hahn. From the beginning, she had worked with Hahn on the neutron bombardment of Uranium, but left Germany for Sweden before fission was discovered. Working there with the experimental data supplied to her by Hahn, she managed, with Otto Robert Frisch's participation, to incorporate Niels Bohr's liquid drop model (first suggested by George Gamow) into fission's theoretical foundation. She also predicted the possibility of chain reactions. In an earlier collaboration with Hahn, she had independently discovered a new chemical element (called protactinium). Bohr nominated both for this work, in addition to recommending the Chemistry prize for Hahn. Hahn's assistant, Fritz Strassmann, was not considered for the Physics prize.

Chien-Shiung Wu disproved the law of the conservation of parity (1956) and was the first Wolf Prize winner in physics. She died in 1997 without receiving a Nobel. Wu assisted Tsung-Dao Lee personally in his parity laws development—with Chen-Ning Yang—by providing him in 1956 with a possible test method for beta decay that worked successfully. Her book Beta Decay (1965) is still a sine qua non reference for nuclear physicists.

Bose–Einstein statistics
Several Nobel Prizes were awarded for research related to the concepts of the boson, Bose–Einstein statistics and Bose–Einstein condensate—the latest being the 2001 Nobel Prize in Physics given for advancing the theory of Bose–Einstein condensates although Satyendra Nath Bose himself was not awarded the Nobel Prize. In his book The Scientific Edge, physicist Jayant Narlikar observed: "SN Bose's work on particle statistics (c.1922), which clarified the behavior of photons (the particles of light in an enclosure) and opened the door to new ideas on statistics of Microsystems that obey the rules of quantum theory, was one of the top ten achievements of 20th century Indian science and could be considered in the Nobel Prize class." The work of other 20th century Indian scientists which Narlikar considered to be of Nobel Prize class were Srinivasa Ramanujan, Chandrasekhara Venkata Raman and Meghnad Saha.
However, when asked about the omission, Bose himself said: "I have got all the recognition I deserve." Rolf-Dieter Heuer, the director general of European organization for nuclear research CERN, commented in a scientific meet in Kolkata titled Frontiers of Science that "it is unfortunate that pioneering Indian physicist Satyendra Nath Bose did not win the Nobel Prize for work on quantum physics in the 1920s that provided the foundation of the Bose–Einstein statistics and the theory of the Bose–Einstein condensate".

Einstein's annus mirabilis

Albert Einstein's 1921 Nobel Prize Award mainly recognized his 1905 discovery of the mechanism of the photoelectric effect and "for his services to Theoretical Physics". The Nobel committee passed on several nominations for his many other seminal contributions, although these led to prizes for others who later applied more advanced technology to experimentally verify his work, most notably the 2017 prize awarded to the heads of LIGO. Many predictions of Einstein's theories have been verified as technology advances. Recent examples include the bending of light in a gravitational field, gravitational waves (detected by LIGO), gravitational lensing and black holes. It was not until 1993 that the first evidence for the existence of gravitational radiation came via the Nobel Prize-winning measurements of the Hulse–Taylor binary system.

The committee also failed to recognize the other contributions of his Annus Mirabilis papers on Brownian motion and special relativity. Often these nominations for Special Relativity were for both Hendrik Lorentz and Einstein. Henri Poincaré was also nominated at least once for his work, including on Lorentz's relativity theory. However, Kaufmann's then-experimental results (incorrectly) cast doubt on Special Relativity. These doubts were not resolved until 1915. By this time, Einstein had progressed to his general theory of relativity, including his theory of gravitation. Empirical support—in this case the predicted spectral shift of sunlight—was in question for many decades. The only piece of original evidence was the consistency with the known perihelion precession of the planet Mercury. Some additional support was gained at the end of 1919, when the predicted deflection of starlight near the sun was confirmed by Arthur Eddington's Solar Eclipse Expedition, though here again the actual results were somewhat ambiguous. Conclusive proof of the gravitational light deflection prediction was not achieved until the 1970s.

Physiology or medicine

2011
The 2011 prize was awarded in part to Ralph Steinman, who died of cancer days before the award, a fact unknown to the Nobel committee at the time of the award. Committee rules prohibit posthumous awards, and Steinman's death created a dilemma unprecedented in the history of the award. The committee ruled that Steinman remained eligible for the award despite his death, under the rule that allows awardees to receive the award who die between being named and the awards ceremony.

2010
The decision to award the 2010 Nobel Prize for Physiology or Medicine to Robert Edwards for developing the technique of in vitro fertilisation was bitterly denounced by the Catholic Church, which objects to all artificial methods of human conception and fertilization as well as to contraception. One Vatican official called the award "out of order", and the International Federation of Catholic Medical Associations issued a statement saying that the use of human embryos, created and discarded "as experimental animals destined for destruction, has led to a culture where they are regarded as commodities rather than the precious individuals which they are".

2008
The 2008 prize was awarded in part to Harald zur Hausen "for his discovery of human papilloma viruses (HPV) causing cervical cancer". The Swedish police anticorruption unit investigated charges of improper influence by AstraZeneca, which had a stake in two lucrative HPV vaccines. The company had agreed to sponsor Nobel Media and Nobel Web and had strong links with two senior figures in the process that chose zur Hausen.

The other half of the 2008 prize was split between Luc Montagnier and Françoise Barré-Sinoussi "for their discovery of human immunodeficiency virus". The omission of Robert Gallo was controversial: 106 scientists signed a letter to the journal Science stating that "While these awardees fully deserve the award, it is equally important to recognize the contributions of Robert C. Gallo", which "warrant equal recognition". Montagnier said that he was "surprised" that the award had not been shared with Gallo.

2006
The 2006 prize went to Andrew Fire and Craig C. Mello "for their discovery of RNA interference—gene silencing by double-stranded RNA". Many of the discoveries credited by the committee to Fire and Mello, who studied RNA interference in Caenorhabditis elegans, had been previously studied by plant biologists, and it was suggested that at least one plant biologist, such as David Baulcombe, should have been awarded a share of the prize.

2003
The 2003 prize was awarded to Paul Lauterbur and Sir Peter Mansfield "for their discoveries concerning magnetic resonance imaging" (MRI). Two independent alternatives have been alleged. Raymond Damadian first reported that nuclear magnetic resonance (NMR) could distinguish in vitro between cancerous and non-cancerous tissues on the basis of different proton relaxation times. He later translated this into the first human scan. Damadian's original report prompted Lauterbur to develop NMR into the present method. Damadian took out large advertisements in an international newspapers protesting his exclusion. Some researchers felt that Damadian's work deserved at least equal credit. Separately, Herman Y. Carr both pioneered the NMR gradient technique and demonstrated rudimentary MRI imaging in the 1950s. The Nobel prize winners had almost certainly seen Carr's work, but did not cite it. Consequently, the prize committee very likely was unaware of Carr's discoveries, a situation likely abetted by Damadian's campaign. Mansfield said in his autobiography that "the person who really missed out" the prize was Erwin Hahn for his contribution to the principles of spin echoes.

1998
The Nobel Prize for Physiology or Medicine was awarded in 1998 to Robert Furchgott, Louis Ignarro and Ferid Murad "for their discoveries concerning nitric oxide as a signalling molecule in the cardiovascular system". There followed protest by the scientific community due to the omission of Salvador Moncada, who was internationally recognized as the major contributor to the discovery of this field together with Robert Furchgott.

1997
The 1997 prize was awarded to Dr. Stanley B. Prusiner for his discovery of prions. This award caused a long stream of polemics. Critics attacked the validity of the work and questioned whether prions exist at all, which claim had been criticized by other researchers as not yet proven. The existence of prions was not fully accepted by the scientific community for at least a decade after the awarding of the prize.

1993
The 1993 prize went to Phillip Allen Sharp and Richard J. Roberts "for their discoveries of split genes", the discovery of introns in eukaryotic DNA, and the mechanism of gene splicing. Several other scientists, such as Norman Davidson and James Watson, argued that Louise T. Chow, a China-born Taiwanese researcher who collaborated with Roberts, should have had part of the prize. In 1976, as Staff Investigator, Chow carried out the studies of the genomic origins and structures of adenovirus transcripts that led directly to the discovery of RNA splicing and alternative RNA processing at Cold Spring Harbor Laboratory on Long Island in 1977. Norman Davidson, a Caltech expert in electron microscopy under whom Chow apprenticed as a graduate student, affirmed that Chow operated the electron microscope through which the splicing process was observed, and was the crucial experiment's sole designer, using techniques she had developed.

1952
The 1952 prize was awarded to Selman Waksman "for his discovery of streptomycin, the first antibiotic effective against tuberculosis". Albert Schatz, who was a graduate student working under Waksman's direction at the time of discovery in 1943, petitioned the Nobel committee saying he had done all the work in isolating the antibiotic properties of Streptomyces griseus. Schatz, who two years earlier had successfully sued Waksman and Rutgers University for his share in the discovery, patent, and resulting royalties, was turned down by the Nobel committee. It was a reflection of the times when department heads were normally awarded the prize and has been looked on as a considerable mistake.

1935
The 1935 prize was awarded to Hans Spemann "for his discovery of the organizer effect in embryonic development". In 1991 Howard M. Lenhoff, then Professor of Developmental and Cell Biology at the University of California, published a paper pointing out that Ethel Browne Harvey should have shared in Spemann's Nobel Prize, because, as a graduate student, she had made a similar discovery many years earlier and understood its significance.  Her work, done in 1909, preceded the experiments in 1924 by Spemann and Hilde Mangold that are credited with discovering the "organizer" — the work that was the basis of the Nobel Prize. Lenhoff noted there is evidence that Spemann knew about Ethel Browne Harvey's work, as she had sent a copy of her paper to Spemann, and in his copy the portion that discussed the significance of her work had been underlined.

1926
In 1926, no prize was awarded because the works of the two nominees Johannes Andreas Grib Fibiger and Katsusaburo Yamagiwa were considered undeserving. Fibiger had demonstrated that he could induce stomach cancer in rats using a roundworm Gongylonema neoplasticum that he discovered (but which he preferred to call Spiroptera carcinoma). Yamagiwa followed suit and induced cancer in rabbit by applying coal tar on the rabbit's ears. Theirs were the first experimental induction of cancer. One of the assessors Hilding Bergstrand concluded that "one cannot, at this point, find much support for the possibility that the work of Fibiger and Yamagiwa will have great importance in the solving of the riddle of cancer. Under such circumstances I do not consider these discoveries worthy of the Nobel Prize." In 1927, Fibiger was again nominated alongside Otto Heinrich Warburg and Julius Wagner-Jauregg; but Yamagiwa was excluded. The Nobel Committee decided to award the 1926 prize jointly to Fibiger and Warburg, and the 1927 prize to Wagner-Jauregg. But at the final selection, Karolinska Institute rejected Warburg. The 1926 prize went solely to Fibiger "for his discovery of the Spiroptera carcinoma". Fibiger's "finding" was discredited by other scientists shortly thereafter. Particularly after the last major experiment in 1952, it was established that the roundworm is not carcinogenic, and that cancers developed in Fibiger's experiments were due to vitamin A deficiency. Yamagiwa's exclusion was also criticised, because his experiment was a valid finding. Coal tar (and substances containing polycyclic aromatic hydrocarbons, or PAHs) are now known to be true carcinogens. Yamagiwa's work has become the primary basis for this line of research. Encyclopædia Britannica guide to Nobel Prizes in cancer research mentions Yamagiwa's work as a milestone without mentioning Fibiger.

1923
The 1923 prize was awarded to Frederick Banting and John Macleod "for the discovery of insulin". Banting clearly deserved the prize, but the choice of Macleod as co-winner was controversial. Banting felt that Charles Best was the proper corecipient, while Macleod had merely given them laboratory space at the University of Toronto while Macleod was away for the summer. On his return, though, Macleod pointed out some flaws in their experimental design and gave them advice about directions in which to work. Banting's original method of isolating insulin required performing surgery on living dogs, which was too labor-intensive to produce insulin on a large scale. Best then set about finding a biochemical extraction method, while James Bertram Collip, a chemistry professor on sabbatical from the University of Alberta, joined Macleod's team and worked in parallel with Best. The two of them succeeded within days of each other. When Banting agreed to receive the prize, he decided to give half of his prize money to Best. Macleod, in turn, split his half of the prize money with Collip.

1906
Camillo Golgi and Santiago Ramón y Cajal were jointly awarded "in recognition of their work on the structure of the nervous system". However, their interpretation of discoveries were directly in opposition. Much as Golgi made significant contributions to the techniques in the study of nervous system in terms of actual structure, he made a completely erroneous conclusion that nervous system is nothing but a single continuous network, the notion called reticular theory. On the other hand, Ramón y Cajal described nervous system as composed of interlinking nerve cells or neurons as suggested by a theory called the neuron doctrine. Golgi strongly advocated the reticular theory such that even his Nobel lecture was a direct attack on Cajal's work and the neuron doctrine, and even depicted a diagram of continuous network which he claimed was "an exact reproduction after life". Therefore, recognising a work on wrong conclusion is inappropriate. The controversy and rivalry between the two scientists lasted even after the award of the Nobel Prize. The award is even dubbed as creating the "storm center of histological controversy". Cajal even commented that: "What a cruel irony of fate of pair, like Siamese twins united by the shoulders, scientific adversaries of such contrasting character!" The neuron doctrine turned out to be a more correct description, and Golgi was proved wrong with the development of electron microscopy in the 1950s by which it was clearly demonstrated that neurons are individual cells in the nervous system, and that they are interconnected through gaps called synapses. Recent studies suggest that there are notable exceptions. Electrical synapses are more common in the central nervous system than previously thought. Thus, rather than functioning as individual units, in some parts of the brain large ensembles of neurons may be active simultaneously to process neural information.

1902
Ronald Ross was awarded basically for his discovery of the life cycle of malarial parasite (as the citation goes: "for his work on malaria, by which he has shown how it enters the organism"). In 1897, independent of Ross, Giovanni Battista Grassi, along with his Italian associates, had established the developmental stages of malaria parasites in anopheline mosquitoes; and they described the complete life cycles of P. falciparum, P. vivax and P. malariae the following year. The initial opinion of the Nobel Committee was that the prize should be shared between Ross and Grassi. Then Ross made a defamatory campaign accusing Grassi of deliberate fraud. The weight of favour ultimately fell on Ross, largely upon the influences of Robert Koch, the appointed "neutral arbitrator" in the committee; as reported, "Koch threw the full weight of his considerable authority in insisting that Grassi did not deserve the honor". The indelible irony was that Ross was definitely the first to show that malarial parasite was transmitted by the bite of infected mosquitoes, in his case the avian Plasmodium relictum. But Grassi's work was much more directly relevant to human health as he demonstrated that human malarial parasites were infected only by female Anopheles (Ross never identified the mosquito species, not being a zoologist; "grey mosquito with dappled wings" was all that he could offer). Grassi identified the species correctly, and in 1898 who first established the complete life cycle of P. falciparum, the first human malarial parasite for which the entire cycle was determined. By today's standard, they should have undoubtedly shared the Nobel.

Others
Oswald Theodore Avery, best known for his 1944 demonstration that DNA is the cause of bacterial transformation and potentially the material of which genes are composed, never received a Nobel Prize, although two Nobel laureates, Joshua Lederberg and Arne Tiselius, praised him and his work as a pioneering platform for further genetic research. According to John M. Barry, in his book The Great Influenza, the committee was preparing to award Avery, but declined to do so after the DNA findings were published, fearing that they would be endorsing findings that had not yet survived significant scrutiny.

Carlos Chagas' 1909 discovery of the tropical parasitic disease which bears his name, Chagas disease, has been looked on by some historical researchers as worthy of a Nobel prize (he received one nomination in 1913 and again in 1921), but may have been denied it because of misunderstandings and infighting between him and his colleges and government officials.

The Nobel Committee does not rescind prizes, even when their validity is eventually disproven. For example, António Egas Moniz received the prize in 1949 for the prefrontal lobotomy which was bestowed despite protests from the medical establishment.

Laureates who declined the prize

Forced refusals

Forced refusals under Nazi Germany
In 1936, the Nobel Foundation offended Adolf Hitler when it awarded the 1935 Nobel Peace Prize to Carl von Ossietzky, a German writer who publicly opposed Hitler and Nazism. (The prize was awarded the following year.) Hitler reacted by issuing a decree on 31 January 1937 that forbade German nationals to accept any Nobel Prize. Awarding the peace prize to Ossietzky was itself considered controversial. While Fascism had few supporters outside Italy, Spain, and Germany, those who did not necessarily sympathize felt that it was wrong to (deliberately) offend Germany.

Hitler's decree prevented three Germans from accepting their prizes: Gerhard Domagk (1939 Nobel Prize in Physiology or Medicine), Richard Kuhn (1938 Nobel Prize in Chemistry), and Adolf Butenandt (1939 Nobel Prize in Chemistry). The three later received their certificates and medals, but not the prize money.

On 19 October 1939, about a month and a half after World War II had started, the Nobel Committee of the Karolinska Institutet met to discuss the 1939 prize in physiology or medicine. The majority favoured Domagk and someone leaked the news, which traveled to Berlin. The Ministry of Culture in Berlin replied with a telegram stating that a Nobel Prize to a German was "completely unwanted". Despite the telegram, a large majority voted for Domagk on 26 October 1939. Once he learned of the decision, hopeful that it only applied to the peace prize, Domagk sent a request to the Ministry of Education in Berlin asking permission to accept the prize. Since he did not receive a reply after more than a week had passed, Domagk felt it would be impolite to wait any longer without responding, and on 3 November 1939 he wrote a letter to the Institute thanking them for the distinction, but added that he had to wait for the government's approval before he could accept the prize.

Domagk was subsequently ordered to send a copy of his letter to the Ministry for Foreign Affairs in Berlin, and on 17 November 1939, was arrested by the Gestapo. He was released after one week, then arrested again. On 28 November 1939, he was forced by the Ministry of Culture to sign a prepared letter, addressed to the institute, declining the prize. Since the Institute had already prepared his medal and diploma before the second letter arrived, they were able to award them to him later, during the 1947 Nobel festival. Domagk was the first to decline a prize. Due to his refusal, the procedures changed so that if a laureate declined the prize or failed to collect the prize award before 1 October of the following year, the money would not be awarded.

On 9 November 1939, the Swedish Royal Academy of Sciences awarded the 1938 Prize for Chemistry to Kuhn and half of the 1939 prize to Butenandt. When notified of the decision, the German scientists were forced to decline by threats of violence. Their refusal letters arrived in Stockholm after Domagk's refusal letter, helping to confirm suspicions that the German government had forced them to refuse the prize. In 1948, they wrote to the academy expressing their gratitude for the prizes and their regret for being forced to refuse them in 1939. They were awarded their medals and diplomas at a ceremony in July 1949.

Other forced refusals
Boris Pasternak at first accepted the 1958 Nobel Prize in Literature, but was forced by Soviet authorities to decline, because the prize was considered a "reward for the dissident political innuendo in his novel, Doctor Zhivago." Pasternak died without ever receiving the prize. He was eventually honoured by the Nobel Foundation at a banquet in Stockholm on 9 December 1989, when they presented his medal to his son.

The 2010 Nobel Peace Prize was awarded to Liu Xiaobo while he was serving a prison sentence for "subversion of the state", with the Chinese government not allowing him or his family members to attend the ceremony.

Voluntary refusals
Two laureates voluntarily declined the Nobel Prize. Jean-Paul Sartre declined the 1964 prize for Literature, stating, "A writer must refuse to allow himself to be transformed into an institution, even if it takes place in the most honourable form." The second person who refused the prize is Lê Đức Thọ, who was awarded the 1973 Peace Prize for his role in the Paris Peace Accords. He declined, saying there was no actual peace in Vietnam. The war resumed four months after he was declared the winner.

Mistakes in the award notification

Physics 1989—The Nobel Committee mistakenly phoned Washington DC economist Norman Ramsey, trying to award him the Nobel Prize in Physics. They meant to call the Harvard University physicist Norman Foster Ramsey Jr..

Chemistry 1987—The Nobel Committee mistakenly phoned Southern California carpet cleaner Donald O. Cram, trying to award him Nobel Prize in Chemistry. They meant to call the Southern California chemist Donald J. Cram.

Nobel rumors
1915 saw a newspaper rumor (starting with a 6 November Reuters report from London) along the lines that the Nobel Prize in Physics was to be awarded to both Thomas Edison and Nikola Tesla. The story had gone to press in many publications before a 15 November Reuters story from Stockholm with the announcement that the prize that year was being awarded to William Henry Bragg and William Lawrence Bragg "for their services in the analysis of crystal structure by means of X-rays". There were unsubstantiated rumors at the time that Tesla and Edison had won the prize and that the Nobel committee had changed recipients when Tesla and/or Edison refused the award (a claim also made many years later attributed to Tesla). The Nobel Foundation declined to comment on the rumors other than saying, "Any rumor that a person has not been given a Nobel Prize because he has made known his intention to refuse the reward is ridiculous", further stating a recipient could only decline a Nobel Prize after he is announced a winner.

Otto Heinrich Warburg, a German national who won the 1931 Nobel Prize in Physiology and Medicine, was rumored to have been selected for the 1944 prize but forbidden to accept it. According to the Nobel Foundation, this story is not true.

Other prizes

Prizes in non-Nobel domains
Multiple primary fields of human intellectual endeavor—such as mathematics, philosophy and social studies—were not included among the Nobel Prizes, because they were not part of Alfred Nobel's will. When Jakob von Uexkull approached the Nobel Foundation with a proposal to establish two new awards for the environment and for the lives of the poor, he was turned down. He then established the Right Livelihood Award.

In 2003 purportedly a new Nobel-equivalent Award was also created especially for mathematics, the Abel Prize, though the older Fields Medal is often considered as the mathematical Nobel equivalent.

However, the Nobel Committee did allow the creation of the Nobel Memorial Prize in Economics. Many people have opposed this expansion, including the Swedish human rights lawyer Peter Nobel, a great-grandnephew of Alfred Nobel. In his speech at the 1974 Nobel banquet, awardee Friedrich Hayek stated that had he been consulted whether to establish an economics prize, he would "have decidedly advised against it" primarily because "the Nobel Prize confers on an individual an authority which in economics no man ought to possess... This does not matter in the natural sciences. Here the influence exercised by an individual is chiefly an influence on his fellow experts; and they will soon cut him down to size if he exceeds his competence. But the influence of the economist that mainly matters is an influence over laymen: politicians, journalists, civil servants and the public generally."

The Kluge Prize, a $1 million prize given by the John W. Kluge Center at the Library of Congress, is awarded for lifetime achievement in fields of humanistic and social science studies that are not included in the Nobel Prizes, most notably history, philosophy, politics, psychology, anthropology, sociology, religious studies, linguistics, and criticism in the arts and humanities.

The Shaw Prize is awarded for achievements in the fields of astronomy and mathematical sciences besides life science and medicine.

The Tang Prize categories include areas of sustainable development and rule of law which are not included in Nobel Prize, and also include biopharmaceutical science and sinology. The panels of judges are convened by Academia Sinica, located in Taiwan, Republic of China.

Alternatives to the Nobel Prizes
Following the announcement of the award of the 2010 Nobel Peace Prize to incarcerated Chinese dissident Liu Xiaobo, the Chinese tabloid Global Times created the Confucius Peace Prize. The award ceremony was deliberately organized to take place on 8 December, one day before the Nobel ceremony. Organizers said that the prize had no relation to the Chinese government, the Ministry of Culture or Beijing Normal University.

The German National Prize for Art and Science was Hitler's alternative to the Nobel Prize.

The Ig Nobel Prize is an American parody of the Nobel Prize.

See also
 Nobel disease

Notes

References

Bibliography

.
.
.
. First published in the United Kingdom as Tuberculosis: The Greatest Story Never Told.
.
.

External links
 Article on Why Was Gandhi Never Awarded the Nobel Peace Prize?
 BBC article on Nobel Peace Prize controversies
 
 Nobel Foundation official site

Controversies
Discovery and invention controversies
Controversies in Sweden